Shae-Lynn Bourne  (born January 24, 1976) is a Canadian ice dancer and choreographer. In 2003, she and partner Victor Kraatz became the first North American ice dancers to win a World Championship. They competed at three Winter Olympic Games, placing 10th at the 1994 Winter Olympics, 4th at the 1998 Winter Olympics, and 4th at the 2002 Winter Olympics.

Since retiring from competitive skating, she has become a renowned choreographer, choreographing programs for Olympic champions Yuzuru Hanyu and Nathan Chen, and World Champions including Evgenia Medvedeva. During the 2020 ISU Skating Awards, Shae-Lynn was named Best Choreographer.

Personal life
Bourne was born on January 24, 1976, in Chatham, Ontario. She has an older brother, Chris, a younger sister, Calea and younger brother Sean. She married her skating coach Nikolai Morozov on August 12, 2005, but the marriage was short-lived, and they divorced in July 2007. She is currently married to Bohdan Turok with whom she has a son, Kai, born in June 2012. She worked as a coach and a choreographer at the Granite Club in Toronto, then moved to the Carolina Ice Palace in Charleston, South Carolina in 2019.

Career
Bourne began skating in 1983. Early in her career, she competed in pair skating with partner Andrew Bertleff. She stated that she enjoyed pairs "but I was dropped a lot, there were a lot of head injuries, and I finally said, 'No more, I'm not going to last much longer if I kept doing this.'"

Partnership with Kraatz
Interested in switching to ice dancing, Bourne traveled to Boucherville, Quebec in 1991 after a coach, Paul Wirtz, suggested that she try out with Victor Kraatz. Although at first Kraatz did not see himself with Bourne, they skated together for a week and a week after she returned to Ontario he asked to form a partnership.

During their career, Bourne/Kraatz were coached at various times by Tatiana Tarasova, Natalia Dubova, Uschi Keszler, Marina Klimova and Sergei Ponomarenko, and Nikolai Morozov. For the 1997–98 season, their free dance was modeled after Riverdance, with footwork instruction provided by Riverdance lead dancer Colin Dunne. Bourne/Kraatz became known for their deep edges and soft knees. They were credited with perfecting and popularizing the hydroblading technique.

Bourne/Kraatz missed the 2000 Four Continents and 2000 World Championships due to Bourne's knee surgery. In spring 2000, they changed coaches, moving to Tatiana Tarasova and Nikolai Morozov in Newington, Connecticut.

Bourne/Kraatz withdrew from their 2002 Grand Prix events due to Bourne's injury. They won their tenth Canadian national title and their third Four Continents title. Bourne/Kraatz went on to become the first World champions in ice dancing from North America, winning gold at the 2003 World Championships in Washington, D.C. They retired from competition at the end of the season.

On October 21, 2003, they announced the end of their partnership; while Bourne enjoyed show skating, Kraatz said he wanted "to experiment with other things and follow up on other dreams that I have". In January 2007, they were inducted into the Skate Canada Hall of Fame.

Ice shows
Bourne has skated solo in shows and tours around the world, such as Stars On Ice, Champions on Ice in North America and Japan, Art On Ice in Switzerland, the 2009 Ice All Stars and the 2010 Festa On Ice, held in Seoul, South Korea. She has also competed on figure skating reality shows like Battle of the Blades (paired with former NHL star player Claude Lemieux, finished second overall) on CBC and Thin Ice on ABC (paired with American pair skater John Zimmerman, finished 2nd overall).

Coach and choreographer
Bourne formerly coached Kaitlyn Weaver / Andrew Poje, and Cathy Reed / Chris Reed. She has choreographed programs for:

Jeremy Abbott
Jun-hwan Cha
Kate Charbonneau
Alaine Chartrand
Nathan Chen
Vaughn Chipeur
Michaela Du Toit
Yuzuru Hanyu
Wakaba Higuchi
Rika Hongo
Rika Kihira
Kiira Korpi
Alena Kostornaia
Mariah Bell
Annabelle Langlois / Cody Hay
Evgenia Medvedeva
Nicolas Nadeau
Yuka Nagai
Alexandra Najarro
Pang Qing / Tong Jian
Elena Radionova
Kevin Reynolds
Joannie Rochette
Andrei Rogozine
Kaori Sakamoto
Julianne Séguin / Charlie Bilodeau
Akiko Suzuki
Daisuke Takahashi
Elizaveta Tuktamysheva
Shoma Uno
Ashley Wagner
Yun Yea-ji
You Young
Rion Sumiyoshi

Show choreography
Shizuka Arakawa: Bourne has choreographed for Arakawa's show Friends on Ice in 2009.
Kurt Browning
Sasha Cohen
Ekaterina Gordeeva

Advocacy
Bourne has used her celebrity to speak out against child abuse. She and Kraatz skated in numerous charity shows such as "Dreams On Ice". Bourne was the honorary chairperson for the "Every Life Counts" campaign for Chatham-Kent. Bourne and Kraatz received the Canadian Governor General's Meritorious Service Crosses for speaking out about unfair judging practices.

Programs
(with Kraatz)

Results
(with Kraatz)

GP: Part of Champions Series from 1995–96 season, renamed Grand Prix series in 1998–99

References

External links

 
 
 

Canadian female ice dancers
Figure skaters at the 1994 Winter Olympics
Figure skaters at the 1998 Winter Olympics
Figure skaters at the 2002 Winter Olympics
Canadian figure skating coaches
Recipients of the Meritorious Service Decoration
Olympic figure skaters of Canada
People from Chatham-Kent
1976 births
Living people
Battle of the Blades participants
World Figure Skating Championships medalists
Four Continents Figure Skating Championships medalists
Female sports coaches
Figure skating choreographers